Liu Xuan (born August 12, 1979) is a former artistic gymnast from China. She competed in the 1996 and 2000 Olympic Games and won two Olympic medals, including gold on the balance beam in 2000. She was born in Changsha, Hunan.

Gymnastics career 
Liu was coached by Guo Xinming and Zhang Zhen. She took up gymnastics with encouragement from her mother, who had to stop training when her gym closed during the Cultural Revolution. In fact, Liu's decision to continue training for another four years after a disappointing performance at the 1996 Olympics (where she failed to make the beam final because of a fall in the team competition) was partly to realize her mother's unfulfilled dream.

In 2000, Liu became China's first Olympic champion on balance beam, as well as its first all-around medalist in women's gymnastics. She also led the Chinese team to a third-place finish, but in 2010, their bronze medal was stripped by the International Olympic Committee and awarded to the United States instead after one of the Chinese team members, Dong Fangxiao, was found to have been underage during the competition. In March 2012, the bronze medal Liu and her teammates won at the 1999 World Artistic Gymnastics Championships was forfeited to Ukraine for the same reason.

Eponymous skill 
Liu was the first female gymnast to perform a one-arm giant swing on the uneven bars; she also performed this skill into a Geinger release move. The skill is named after her in the Code of Points, but because it was considered too risky for women, it was given a low difficulty rating to discourage gymnasts from attempting it. As a result, Liu stopped performing it after the 1996 Olympics.

Post-gymnastics career 
At the 2008 Summer Olympics in Beijing, Liu served as the on-site gymnastics reporter for Hong Kong broadcaster TVB.

In July 2009, she became a contracted actress for TVB.

Personal life 
Liu married her boyfriend, musician Wang Tao, in Happy Valley, Hong Kong in December 2013.

Results 
2000 Olympics: 3rd team (disqualified), 3rd all-around, 1st balance beam
1998 Asian Games: 1st team, 1st all-around, 1st beam
1998 World Cup: 1st beam, 3rd bars
1997 World Championships: 3rd team, 7th all-around
1996 Olympics: 4th team
1996 World Championships: 3rd beam, 9th bars
1995 World Championships: 2nd team
1995 USA/CHN/BLR: 3rd team, 8th all-around
1994 DTB Cup: 1st beam, 5th bars, 8th floor
1994 Asian Games: 1st team, 2nd bars
1994 World Championships: 4th team

Eponymous skills

Discography

Filmography

Films

TV series

TV shows

References

External links

List of competitive results at Gymn Forum

Biography of Liu Xuan 

1979 births
Living people
Chinese female artistic gymnasts
Gymnasts at the 1996 Summer Olympics
Gymnasts at the 2000 Summer Olympics
Olympic bronze medalists for China
Olympic gold medalists for China
Olympic gymnasts of China
People with acquired residency of Hong Kong
Medalists at the World Artistic Gymnastics Championships
TVB actors
Olympic medalists in gymnastics
Chinese expatriate sportspeople in Hong Kong

Competitors stripped of Summer Olympics medals
Sportspeople from Changsha
Asian Games medalists in gymnastics
Gymnasts at the 1994 Asian Games
Gymnasts at the 1998 Asian Games
Medalists at the 2000 Summer Olympics
Asian Games gold medalists for China
Asian Games silver medalists for China
Medalists at the 1994 Asian Games
Medalists at the 1998 Asian Games
21st-century Chinese actresses
Actresses from Changsha
Chinese film actresses
Chinese television actresses
Gymnasts from Hunan
Originators of elements in artistic gymnastics